The China–North Korea border is the international border separating the People's Republic of China (PRC) and the Democratic People's Republic of Korea (DPRK). It runs for 1,352 km (840 mi) from the estuary of the Yalu River in the Korea Bay in the west to the tripoint with Russia in the east.

Geography

From west to east, the Yalu River, Paektu Mountain, and the Tumen River divides the two countries.

Dandong, in the Liaoning Province of China, on the Yalu River delta, is the largest city on the border. On the other side of the river is the city of Sinuiju in North Pyongan Province, North Korea. The two cities are situated on the Yalu river delta at the western end of the border, near the Yellow Sea. Their waterfronts face each other and are connected by the Sino-Korean Friendship Bridge.

There are 205 islands on the Yalu River. A 1962 border treaty between North Korea and China split the islands according to which ethnic group were living on each island. North Korea possesses 127 and China 78. Due to the division criteria, some islands such as Hwanggumpyong Island belong to North Korea even though they are on the Chinese side of the river. Both countries have navigation rights on the river, including in the delta.

The source of the Yalu River is Heaven Lake on Paektu Mountain, which is considered the birthplace of the Korean and Manchu peoples. This lake is also the source of the Tumen River which forms the eastern portion of the border.

History
Historically the border areas have been contested by successive Chinese and Korean polities, though the current border utilising the Yalu-Tumen rivers appears to have been in place by the mid 15th century. The Manchu (Qing) dynasty of China managed to consolidate control of north-east China (Manchuria) and establish a nebulous 'tributary' rule over Joseon Korea. In 1712 the Chinese Emperor Kangxi and Joseon King Sukjong authorised a border mission to analyse the border alignment in the vicinity of the Yalu-Yumen headwaters on Mount Paektu. A pillar was erected indicating the border alignment in this section, and a demilitarised neutral zone set along the frontier. In 1875 China, fearful of the Russia presence to the east, occupied its section of the neutral zone. A Chinese-Korean boundary team surveyed the Mt Paektu area in 1885–87, however there were disputes over whether the pillar had been moved, and the two sides were unable to agree precisely which of the several headwater streams should form the frontier. In 1889 the Chinese unilaterally demarcated a frontier in the area, marking it with a series of posts, however these were later destroyed by the Koreans. Korea also made periodic claims to Korean-inhabited lands (Jiandao) north of the Tumen.

In the early 20th century Korea came under the increasing influence of Japan, and by 1905 it was deemed a Japanese protectorate. In 1909 China and Japan signed the Gando Convention, whereby Korea was made to renounce any claims north of the Yalu-Tumen line in return for extensive Chinese concessions to Japan. In the Mount Paektu area the 1712 pillar was confirmed as the border marker, and the Shiyi/Sogul headwater stream utilised up to the Tumen border. The following year Japan formally annexed Korea. In 1962, with Japanese rule in Korea over and with both China and North Korea now forming Communist states, a border treaty was signed which fixed the boundary line along the Yalu and Tumen rivers, with the middle overland section running across Mount Paektu and through Heaven Lake. A subsequent protocol of 1964 allocated the numerous riverine islets, granting 264 to North Korea and 187 to China.

Trade and contact

Its border with China has been described as North Korea's "lifeline to the outside world." Much of the China-North Korea trade goes through the port of Dandong.

Chinese cell phone service has been known to extend as far as  into Korean territory, which has led to the development of a black market for Chinese cell phones in the border regions. International calls are strictly forbidden in North Korea, and violators put themselves at considerable peril to acquire such phones.

Tourists in Dandong can take speedboat rides along the North Korean side of the Amnok River and up its tributaries.

A common wedding day event for many Chinese couples involve renting boats, putting life preservers on over their wedding clothes, and going to the North Korean border to have wedding photos taken.

Memory cards and teddy bears are reportedly among the most popular items for North Koreans shopping in Dandong.

Crossings

Border security

The 1,420 km border between North Korea and China has been described as "porous". Many North Korean defectors cross into China.

The Chinese government transferred responsibility for managing the border to the army from the police in 2003. Chinese authorities began building wire fences "on major defection routes along the Tumen River" in 2003. Beginning in September 2006, China erected a  fence on the border near Dandong, along stretches of the Yalu River delta with lower banks and narrower width.

In 2007 a U.S. official stated that China was building more "fences and installations at key border outposts". In the same year, it was reported that North Korea had started building a fence along a  stretch of its side of the Yalu River, and had also built a road to guard the area.

It was also reported that China was reinforcing patrols, and that new patrol posts were being built on higher ground to give wider visibility over the area. According to a resident of the area: "It's the first time such strong border fences are being erected here. Looks like it is related to the unstable situation in North Korea." The resident also added that previously "anybody could cross if they really wanted" as the fence had only been  with no barbed wire.

In 2014, an Australian journalist who visited Dandong reported a low level of border security. In 2015, fencing was reported as the exception rather than the rule. In 2015, a photojournalist who traveled along the Chinese side of the border commented that fencing was rare and that it would be easy to cross the Amnok river when it was frozen. The same report noted friendly contact between people on opposite sides of the border. In 2018, a photojournalist drove along the border and described it as "mile after mile of nothing, guarded by no-one".

In 2015, a single rogue North Korean soldier killed four ethnic Korean citizens of China who lived along the border of China with North Korea.

Rumours of Chinese troop mobilizations on the border frequently circulate in times of heightened tension on the Korean peninsula. According to scholar Adam Cathcart, these rumours are hard to substantiate and hard to interpret.

A leaked China Mobile document that went viral on Chinese social media on 7 December 2017 allegedly revealed Chinese government plans to construct five "refugee settlement points" along the border to North Korea in Changbai county and Jilin province. This was apparently in preparation for a large influx of North Korean refugees if the Kim regime collapsed in a potential conflict with the United States. The Guardian quoted the document: "Due to cross-border tensions … the [Communist] party committee and government of Changbai county has proposed setting up five refugee camps in the county."

Maps

See also

North Korean defectors
China–North Korea relations

Notes

References

External links

The Tumen River Documentation Project at Sino-NK

 China-Korea Boundary

 
Borders of China
Borders of North Korea
International borders